Čechtice is a market town in Benešov District in the Central Bohemian Region of the Czech Republic. It has about 1,400 inhabitants.

Administrative parts
Villages of Černičí, Dobříkovice, Jeníkov, Krčmy, Malá Paseka, Nakvasovice, Nové Práchňany, Otročice, Palčice, Růžkovy Lhotice, Staré Práchňany, Sudislavice and Zhoř are administrative parts of Čechtice.

Geography
It lies in the Křemešník Highlands.

History
The first written mention of Čechtice is from 1315. The greatest prosperity occurred in the 16th century, during the rule of the Střela of Rokyce family. As a result, Čechtice was promoted to a market town in 1592. The properties of the family were confiscated in 1622 after the Battle of White Mountain.

After the Battle of White Mountain, Čechtice were acquired by the Halleweil family. They had built here a castle. The next notable owner of the estate was John Leopold of Trautson and Falkenstein, who bought it in 1702. He restored the local school and moved the administration of the estate from Křivsoudov to Čechtice.

Sights
The Čechtice Castle is a Baroque castle built in 1656–1658. Its north wing was never completed, but the west wing was extended at the end of the 17th century. Today it is a hotel.

The Church of Saint James the Great was originally a Gothic church from the 14th century. After it was badly damaged by fires in 1741 and 1792, it was rebuilt in the Baroque style.

References

External links

Market towns in the Czech Republic